Allegro was a high-speed train service, operated by Alstom VR Class Sm6 trains, between Helsinki, Finland, and St. Petersburg, Russia. The service started on 12 December 2010. The name Allegro is a musical term for a quick tempo, thereby suggesting "high speed". 

The service was suspended between 18 March 2020 and 11 December 2021 due to the COVID-19 pandemic. Service resumed with restrictions on 12 December 2021.

During the 2022 Russian financial crisis, in the aftermath of international sanctions placed on Russian companies following the 2022 Russian invasion of Ukraine, the Allegro train became a primary means for people to leave Russia. As European airspace had been closed to Russian planes, and Russian airspace is closed to European planes, the train is the only passenger connection between Russia and the European Union. EU authorities have asked VR to keep this train running so that those wishing to leave Russia can do so (though as part of COVID-19 restrictions, only Finnish and Russian citizens had been allowed to use the train, and it runs only twice a day at half-capacity, of 327 passengers; but operators had been  working to lift those restrictions in order to allow the evacuation of other nationals). The train has been suspended since 27 March 2022 due to the aforementioned sanctions.

In August 2022, it became known that VR Group had written off all Allegro trains and their spare parts for a total amount of 45.4 million euros. The operator does not plan to resume their use.

Route
Allegro connected the following stations:
 St. Petersburg (Finlyandsky station)
 Vyborg
 Vainikkala
 Kouvola
 Lahti
 Tikkurila
 Helsinki (Central Station)

The trains also stopped previously in Pasila like every other passenger train from and to Helsinki, but this stop was discontinued between 27 March 2016 and 29 March 2020, when the stop in Pasila was revived.

Vainikkala (on the Finnish side of the border) and Vyborg are special stations: on trains bound for Finland, passengers are not allowed to leave the train at Vyborg, as the train only stops to pick up passengers; and on trains bound for Russia, passengers are not allowed to leave the train at Vainikkala, for the same reason.

Passport and Customs controls

On board the train, each passenger is visited by Finnish passport control and customs officers, as well as their Russian counterparts.

Finnish border control takes place while the train is travelling between Kouvola and Vainikkala, while Russian border control takes place while the train is travelling between Vyborg and St Petersburg. If boarding/exiting at Vainikkala or Vyborg, the checks take place inside these stations.

Vehicles

The Allegro service was operated using Class Sm6 trainsets built by Alstom. Sm6 stands for electric multiple unit (literally 'electric motor train') model 6.

The Sm6 appears externally similar to VR's earlier Sm3 Pendolino series, but is based on the fourth generation 'Pendolino Nuovo' or 'New Pendolino' designs and its construction differs from the Sm3 in many ways.

The aim was to reduce travel time between Helsinki and Saint Petersburg from 5½ hours to 3 hours. The travel time  was 3 hours 27 minutes.

All four Sm6 trains were refurbished by VR FleetCare between 2018 and 2019. The Sm6 fleet was primarily maintained at Ilmala depot north of Helsinki, although some maintenance mainly related to Russian technical systems was also performed in Saint Petersburg.

The Sm6 is equipped to operate on both the Finnish and the Russian railway networks. The units have dual-voltage electrical equipment able to use both the Finnish 25 kV 50 Hz alternating current and the Russian 3 kV direct current electrification systems. The units are equipped for both the Finnish and Russian railway technical systems, which differ substantially.

On board services
 Food: there is a restaurant coach, which serves food during the whole journey, except during customs inspection.
 Currency exchange: there is an agent walking constantly back and forth on the train offering currency exchange services.
 Children's area: there is an area where small children can play.

Russian-Finnish cooperation
The trains were owned by Karelian Trains, a 50–50 joint venture between VR Group (Finnish Railways) and Russian Railways (RZD). The trains are able to run on both Finnish and Russian tracks.

On board the inaugural service were Finnish president Tarja Halonen and Russian prime minister Vladimir Putin.

The cooperation ended completely in 2022 because the 2022 Russian invasion of Ukraine.

See also 
 List of high speed trains

References

External links 
 
 Footage of a stop at Kerava station during a test run on 7 April 2010
 Oy Karelian Trains Ltd
 Скоростной поезд "Аллегро" (Russian)
 VR (Official Finnish Railways) website

Electric multiple units of Russia
3000 V DC multiple units
25 kV AC multiple units
Railway services introduced in 2010
A
A
A